Arziman Rizvanov (born on 25 October 1999 in Baku) is an Azerbaijani football midfielder.

Career

Club
Rizvanov made his professional debut for Avanhard-2 Kramatorsk in the Ukrainian Second League on 31 August 2019, starting in the home match against Alians.

References

External links
 
 

1999 births
Living people
Association football midfielders
Azerbaijani footballers
Azerbaijan youth international footballers
Azerbaijani expatriate footballers
Expatriate footballers in Ukraine
Ukrainian First League players
FC Kramatorsk players